The Fairbanks Exploration Company Gold Dredge No. 5 was a historic gold mining dredge in a remote area of Fairbanks North Star Borough, Alaska, north of the city of Fairbanks. The dredge was manufactured by the Bethlehem Steel Company in 1928, shipped in pieces to Alaska, and assembled by the Fairbanks Exploration Company on Cleary Creek, where it was used until 1942. It thereafter served on Eldorado Creek (1947–55) and Dome Creek (1955-59) before it was abandoned.

The dredge was listed on the National Register of Historic Places in 2004.

See also
National Register of Historic Places listings in Fairbanks North Star Borough, Alaska

References

1929 establishments in Alaska
Buildings and structures completed in 1929
Demolished buildings and structures in Alaska
Gold mining in the United States
Industrial buildings and structures on the National Register of Historic Places in Alaska
Industrial equipment on the National Register of Historic Places
Gold dredges
Buildings and structures on the National Register of Historic Places in Fairbanks North Star Borough, Alaska